Šentlambert ( or ; in older sources also Šent Lampert) is a village in the hills west of Zagorje ob Savi in central Slovenia. The area is part of the traditional region of Upper Carniola. It is now included with the rest of the Municipality of Zagorje ob Savi in the Central Sava Statistical Region.

Church

The local parish church, from which the settlement gets its name, is dedicated to Saint Lambert and belongs to the Roman Catholic Archdiocese of Ljubljana. It is a Neo-Romanesque building dating to 1867.

References

External links
Šentlambert on Geopedia

Populated places in the Municipality of Zagorje ob Savi